Dexter is a town in Chaves County, New Mexico. The population was 1,266 at the time of the 2010 census.

Geography
New Mexico State Road 2 passes through the town, leading northwest  to Roswell, the county seat, and southeast  to Hagerman.

Demographics

As of the census of 2000, there were 1,235 people, 390 households, and 333 families residing in the town. The population density was 1,681.2 people per square mile (653.2/km2). There were 434 housing units at an average density of 590.8 per square mile (229.5/km2). The racial makeup of the town was 60.00% White, 0.24% African American, 0.73% Native American, 35.47% from other races, and 3.56% from two or more races. Hispanic or Latino of any race were 71.17% of the population.

There were 390 households, out of which 47.9% had children under the age of 18 living with them, 62.3% were married couples living together, 17.7% had a female householder with no husband present, and 14.6% were non-families. 11.5% of all households were made up of individuals, and 4.9% had someone living alone who was 65 years of age or older. The average household size was 3.17 and the average family size was 3.39.

In the town, the population was spread out, with 35.3% under the age of 18, 9.9% from 18 to 24, 27.4% from 25 to 44, 17.1% from 45 to 64, and 10.3% who were 65 years of age or older. The median age was 30 years. For every 100 females, there were 94.8 males. For every 100 females age 18 and over, there were 86.7 males.

The median income for a household in the town was $30,707, and the median income for a family was $31,316. Males had a median income of $23,950 versus $16,591 for females. The per capita income for the town was $10,239. About 14.8% of families and 14.9% of the population were below the poverty line, including 16.2% of those under age 18 and 31.5% of those age 65 or over.

Notable person
Mike E. Smith, jockey who won the Triple Crown in 2018

References

External links
 A view of Dexter from the air

Towns in Chaves County, New Mexico
Towns in New Mexico